XADS (Xtreme Alternative Defense Systems) is a privately held firm in Anderson, Indiana, United States. XADS is a  producer of NLDEW (Non-lethal (less than lethal) directed energy weapons) for protecting and defending in military operations, law enforcement, site security, and peacekeeping. XADS was founded in 2002 after a proposal was submitted to the United States Marine Corps.

XADS is developing a short-range wireless electroshock weapon called StunStrike. Contracts have been awarded to XADS to provide new solutions to problems on the battlefield.

XADS makes the Photonic Disruptor Series. It is called a Threat Assessment Laser Illuminator (TALI); but it can cause night-blindness and secondary effects such as nausea; it is claimed to leave no permanent eye damage.

PD/G 105 
The Photonic Disruptor/Green 105 mW laser illuminator is XADS's military grade laser. The laser runs off two AAA batteries and has a range of over 350 meters in darkness, with an operating life of 3000–5000 hours. The unit can be rail mounted for use with weapons. It is deployed in the field in Iraq and Afghanistan.

See also
StunStrike
Electrolaser#Xtreme Alternative Defense Systems

References 

Anderson, Indiana
Companies based in Indiana
Defense companies of the United States
Firearm manufacturers of the United States